David William Crampton (born 9 June 1949) is an English footballer who played as a goalkeeper in the Football League for Darlington. He began his career in non-league football with Spennymoor United, and was on the books of Blackburn Rovers without representing them in the league.

References

1949 births
Living people
People from Bearpark
Footballers from County Durham
English footballers
Association football goalkeepers
Spennymoor United F.C. players
Blackburn Rovers F.C. players
Darlington F.C. players
English Football League players